Ponniyin Selvan is an Indian Tamil-language novel written by Kalki Krishnamurthy.

Ponniyin Selvan may also refer to:

 Ponniyin Selvan (2005 film), an Indian Tamil-language film written and directed by Radha Mohan
 Ponniyin Selvan: I, a 2022 Indian Tamil-language film based on the Kalki novel Ponniyin Selvan, written and directed by Mani Ratnam
 Ponniyin Selvan: I (soundtrack), a soundtrack album by A. R. Rahman for the film of the same name
 Ponniyin Selvan (web series), an upcoming Indian Tamil-language web series